Dudjom Lingpa (1835–1904) was a Tibetan meditation master, spiritual teacher and tertön. He stands out from the norm of Tibetan Buddhist teachers in the sense that he had no formal education, nor did he take ordination as a monk or belong to any established Buddhist school or tradition of his time.

He was met with great skepticism by many of his contemporaries, due to the fact that, despite not studying under any established Buddhist teachers of his time, he claimed to receive teachings on meditation and spiritual practice directly from non-physical masters like Guru Rinpoche and Yeshe Tsogyal, as well as Bodhisattvas such as Avalokitesvara and Manjushri. It was not until his disciples started showing clear signs of spiritual maturity, that he was accepted by his contemporaries as an authentic teacher and tertön.

Today his teachings and literary works, especially those on non-meditation (dzogchen), are highly regarded within the Nyingma-tradition of Tibetan Buddhism.

Dudjom Tersar
Dudjom Tersar is the collective name for the large collection of terma teachings revealed by Dudjom Lingpa and Dudjom Rinpoche. As a class of texts, Tersar means "new or recently-revealed treasure teachings". Dudjom Rinpoche was a major tertön or revealer of hidden teachings.

Nang Jang
Nang Jang (refinement of perception) is the name given to a visionary text of the Tibetan Dzogchen tradition, in which the Dzogchen master, Dudjom Lingpa, experiences visionary visitation from fourteen awakened beings, including Avalokiteshvara and Longchenpa, who teach him of the illusiory nature of all things and how they arise from the basis or primordial state.

According to the teachings bestowed upon Dudjom Lingpa by the highly advanced spiritual beings who visit him in this text, all phenomenal, sensible things are empty and illusory. Yet there is that which is not separate from them, nor they from it, and which can be described as the 'ground of being'. Orgyan Tsokyey Dorje (one of the spiritual visitants) states:

The text also tells of how the Buddha nature, the heart of awareness, is utterly pure and lucid and constitutes the very life essence of all things, both samsaric and nirvanic. Ekajati declares:

This is ultimate reality, a state of truth beyond ordinary mundane consciousness and beyond the power of words to describe. It is designated by Zurchhung Sheyrab Dragpa in the text as "a supreme and inexpressible state," the "fundamental nature beyond ordinary consciousness." The practitioner of this spiritual path is urged to strive for obtaining of an ultimate all-knowingness which transcends time:

References

Citations

Works cited

1835 births
1904 deaths
19th-century lamas
19th-century Tibetan people
20th-century lamas
20th-century Tibetan people
Nyingma lamas
Nyingma tulkus
Rinpoches
Tertöns
Tibetan Buddhists from Tibet